P. nepalensis may refer to:

 Pachykytospora nepalensis, a bracket fungus
 Pandanus nepalensis, an Old World monocot
 Parena nepalensis, a ground beetle
 Persicaria nepalensis, a flowering plant
 Phloeozeteus nepalensis, a ground beetle
 Phryno nepalensis, a tachina fly
 Phyllonorycter nepalensis, a Nepalese moth
 Piptanthus nepalensis, an Asian plant
 Plagiochila nepalensis, a liverwort with thin leaf-like flaps on either side of the stem
 Platambus nepalensis, a beetle native to the Palearctic
 Platynaspis nepalensis, a ladybird that feeds on scale insects
 Platynus nepalensis, a ground beetle
 Poecilosomella nepalensis, a small dung fly
 Potentilla nepalensis, a perennial plant
 Pristosia nepalensis, a ground beetle
 Pseudopostega nepalensis, a Nepalese moth
 Psilorhynchus nepalensis, a mountain carp
 Pterostichus nepalensis, a ground beetle
 Puccinia nepalensis, a plant pathogen